La Joya is a census-designated place  in Socorro County, New Mexico, United States. Its population was 82 as of the 2010 census. La Joya has a post office with ZIP code 87028, which opened on February 28, 1883.

Demographics

History 
La Joya was settled in 1598 by the Piro Indians, who built a pueblo at the site.

Education
Its school district is Belén Consolidated Schools. Belén High School is the district's comprehensive high school.

References

Census-designated places in New Mexico
Census-designated places in Socorro County, New Mexico
Populated places established in 1598